VPT  may refer to:

 Valor por Tamaulipas
 Vermont Public Television
 Volume, temperature and pressure, the three parameters in the combined gas law